Harford County is located in the U.S. state of Maryland. As of the 2020 census, the population was 260,924. Its county seat is Bel Air. Harford County is included in the Baltimore-Columbia-Towson, MD Metropolitan Statistical Area, which is also included in the Washington-Baltimore-Arlington, DC-MD-VA-WV-PA Combined Statistical Area.

History
In 1608  the area was settled by Massawomecks and Susquehannocks. The first European to see the area was John Smith in 1608 when he traveled up the Chesapeake Bay from Jamestown. In 1652, the English and Susquehannocks signed a treaty at what is now Annapolis for the area now called Harford County.

Harford County was formed on March 22, 1774, from the eastern part of Baltimore County with a population of 13,000 people. On March 22, 1775, Harford County hosted the signers of the Bush Declaration, a precursor document to the American Revolution. On January 22, 1782, Bel Air became the county seat.

Havre de Grace, a city incorporated in 1785 within Harford County, was once under consideration to be the capital of the United States rather than Washington, D.C. It was favored for its strategic location at the top of the Chesapeake Bay; this location would facilitate trade while being secure in time of war.  Today, the waterways around Havre de Grace have become adversely affected by silt runoff, which is one of the primary environmental issues of Harford County. While today the site is a Maryland National Guard military reservation, the land was used as the Havre de Grace Racetrack where racehorse Man o' War ran in 1919 and 1920.

During the 1900s the Bata Shoe Company employed numerous Eastern European refugees at the Belcamp factory. In June 1972 Hurricane Agnes overflowed the dam and flooded areas in many states. On the County Health Rankings & Roadmaps by the Robert Wood Johnson Foundation with the University of Wisconsin Population Health Institute, "prior to the 2016 report ... Harford's yearly rankings typically fell between ninth and 10th place, primarily because of the percentage of county residents who were obese or who smoked." Scenes from Tuck Everlasting, From Within, and House of Cards were all filmed in Harford County.

In 2011 the Office of National Drug Control Policy deemed Harford County a designated High Intensity Drug Trafficking Area.

The county was named for Henry Harford (ca. 1759–1834), the illegitimate son of Frederick Calvert, 6th Baron Baltimore. Henry Harford was born to Calvert's mistress, Hester Whelan, whose residence still stands as part of a private residence on Jarretsville Pike, in Phoenix, Maryland.  Harford served as the last Proprietary Governor of Maryland but, because of his illegitimacy, did not inherit his father's title. There are 79 properties and districts listed on the National Register in the county, including one National Historic Landmark called Sion Hill.

Environmental history
Harford County has environmental issues in three major areas:  land use, water pollution/urban runoff, and soil contamination/groundwater contamination.

As the county sits at the headwaters of the Chesapeake Bay along the Susquehanna River, it plays a key role in controlling sediment and fertilizer runoff into the bay as well as fostering submerged aquatic vegetation (SAV) regrowth. The county has had to balance the needs of land owners to practice agriculture and/or pave land (creating impervious surfaces) with effects of runoff into the bay.

Harford County has been burdened by soil contamination and groundwater contamination since the creation of the Aberdeen Proving Ground in 1917. The military installation performs research for the U.S. Army, including weapons testing, and has released various chemical agents into soil and groundwater, including mustard gas and perchlorate. The bordering towns of Aberdeen, Edgewood and Joppatowne have been affected by this contamination.

Aberdeen Proving Ground contains three Superfund priority sites . Groundwater contamination by MTBE, a mandatory gasoline additive, has also affected Fallston.

Harford County also faces controversy from residents living near Scarboro Landfill and Harford Waste Disposal Center, the only municipal landfill. The landfill, approved to triple in size in 2007, is the subject of complaints by neighbors of operating violations, such as large areas of open trash and blown litter; leachate breaks which contaminate area residential wells and flow into Deer Creek, a tributary of the Susquehanna River; and increased health problems.

Geography

Harford County straddles the border between the rolling hills of the Piedmont Plateau and the flatlands of the Atlantic Coastal Plain along the Chesapeake Bay and its tributaries.  The county's development is a mix of rural and suburban, with denser development in the larger towns of Aberdeen and Bel Air and along Route 40 and other major arteries leading out of Baltimore.  The highest elevations are in the north and northwest of the county, reaching 805 ft. near the Pennsylvania border in the county's northwestern corner. The lowest elevation is sea level along the Chesapeake Bay.

Adjacent counties
 York County, Pennsylvania (north)
 Lancaster County, Pennsylvania (northeast)
 Cecil County (east)
 Kent County (south)
 Baltimore County (west)

National protected area
 Susquehanna River National Wildlife Refuge

Communities

Cities

 Aberdeen
 Havre de Grace

Town
 Bel Air (county seat)

Unincorporated communities
 Aldino
 Benson
 Berkley
 Cardiff
 Castleton
 Churchville
 Clayton
 Constant Friendship
 Creswell
 Dublin
 Darlington
 Emmorton
 Fairview
 Forest Hill
 Fountain Green
 Glenwood
 Hess
 Hickory
 Hopewell Village
 Joppa
 Kalmia
 Level
 Madonna
 Norrisville
 Shawsville
 Street
 Taylor
 Whiteford

Census-designated places

 Aberdeen Proving Ground
 Abingdon
 Bel Air North
 Bel Air South
 Darlington
 Edgewood
 Fallston
 Jarrettsville
 Joppatowne
 Perryman
 Pleasant Hills
 Pylesville
 Riverside

Populated places
 Glenville

Climate
The January freezing isotherm runs across the northern part of the county and divides it into a humid subtropical climate (Cfa) and a hot-summer humid continental climate (Dfa.) Average monthly temperatures in Bel Air range from 32.6 °F in January to 76.6 °F in July, while in Aberdeen they range from 33.5 °F in January to 77,2 °F in July.

Politics and government
Harford County is, like the Pennsylvania Dutch Country to its north, a strongly Republican region. No Democratic presidential candidate has carried Harford County since Lyndon Johnson’s landslide of 1964. In the period before World War II Harford leaned strongly Democratic as it had sizeable Confederate sympathies, but during and since World War II the county has turned away from its traditional allegiances.

|}

Harford County was granted a charter form of government in 1972. This means that the county is run by a County Executive and Council President, both elected at large, as well as Council Members, elected from districts. Currently, there are six districts in Harford County. Also elected at large is the Sheriff, who runs the Harford County Sheriff's Office, the Register of Wills and the Clerk of the Circuit Court.

Executive
The Harford County Executive is Robert Cassilly (Republican). Primary law enforcement in the county is handled by the Harford County Sheriff's Office, which has precincts in Jarrettsville, Edgewood and Bel Air. The current Sheriff is Jeffrey Gahler (R). The Maryland State Police also have a barrack located in Bel Air which serves the citizens of Harford County. Municipal police needs are provided by the Bel Air Police Department, the Aberdeen Police Department and the Havre De Grace Police Department. The current State's Attorney is Al Peisinger. Directors are nominated by the Executive and approved by the Council.  The Volunteer Fire & EMS Association department is led by Russell Eyre.

Council

Patrick Vincenti is the council president. Dion F. Guthrie represents district A which includes Joppa and Edgewood. Aaron David Penman represents district B which includes Abingdon and Fallston. Tony "G" Giangiordano represents district C which includes Bel Air and Forest Hill. James Reilly represents district D which includes Jarrettsville, Street, and Darlington. Jessica Boyle-Tsottles represents district E which includes Churchville and Aberdeen. Jacob D. Bennett represents district F which includes Belcamp and Havre de Grace.

Demographics

2000 census
As of the census of 2000, there were 218,590 people, 79,667 households, and 60,387 families residing in the county.  The population density was 496 people per square mile (192/km2). There were 83,146 housing units at an average density of 189 per square mile (73/km2). The racial makeup of the county was 86.77% White, 9.27% African-American, 0.23% Native American, 1.52% Asian, 0.06% Pacific Islander, 0.69% from other races, and 1.47% from two or more races.  1.91% of the population were Hispanic or Latino of any race. 22.5% were of German, 13.1% Irish, 9.8% Italian, 9.2% English, 8.1% "American" and 6.0% Polish ancestry.

By 2006 the population of Harford County had risen 10.4% to 241,402.

The 2005 report on race and ethnicity indicated the county's population was 82.8% non-Hispanic whites. The proportion of African-Americans in the county had risen to 11.5%. Hispanics were now 2.4% of the total population.

In 2000 there were 79,667 households, out of which 38.70% had children under the age of 18 living with them, 61.90% were married couples living together, 10.20% had a female householder with no husband present, and 24.20% were non-families. 19.70% of all households were made up of individuals, and 6.80% had someone living alone who was 65 years of age or older.  The average household size was 2.72 and the average family size was 3.14.

In the county, the age distribution of the population shows 27.90% under the age of 18, 6.80% from 18 to 24, 31.60% from 25 to 44, 23.70% from 45 to 64, and 10.10% who were 65 years of age or older. The median age was 36 years. For every 100 females there were 96.00 males. For every 100 females age 18 and over, there were 92.50 males.

The median income for a household in the county was $57,234, and the median income for a family was $63,868. Males had a median income of $43,612 versus $30,741 for females. The per capita income for the county was $24,232.  About 3.60% of families and 4.90% of the population were below the poverty line, including 5.80% of those under age 18 and 6.70% of those age 65 or over.

2010 census
As of the 2010 United States Census, there were 244,826 people, 90,218 households, and 66,335 families residing in the county. The racial makeup of the county was 81.2% white, 12.7% black or African American, 2.4% Asian, 0.3% American Indian, 0.1% Pacific islander, 0.9% from other races, and 2.5% from two or more races. Those of Hispanic or Latino origin made up 3.5% of the population. In terms of ancestry, 28.1% were German, 19.8% were Irish, 12.2% were English, 9.9% were Italian, 6.8% were Polish, and 6.2% were American.

Of the 90,218 households, 36.6% had children under the age of 18 living with them, 57.9% were married couples living together, 11.3% had a female householder with no husband present, 26.5% were non-families, and 21.5% of all households were made up of individuals. The average household size was 2.68 and the average family size was 3.13. The median age was 39.4 years.

The median income for a household in the county was $77,010 and the median income for a family was $88,370. Males had a median income of $59,734 versus $44,706 for females. The per capita income for the county was $33,559. About 4.0% of families and 5.6% of the population were below the poverty line, including 7.3% of those under age 18 and 5.9% of those age 65 or over.

Economy
According to the Maryland Department of Business and Economic Development, the following were the top employers in Harford County:

Culture
The Susquehanna Symphony Orchestra, formerly the Harford Community Orchestra, is an orchestra that is based in Harford County. The group is made up of about 80 musicians from many professions.

The Havre De Grace Decoy Museum is a museum dedicated to working and decorative decoys used on the Chesapeake Bay.

Harford Community College hosts many cultural spots. The Student Center hosts the Chesapeake Gallery, a collection of artwork from established artists, as well as students and faculty, and the Chesapeake Theater, a theater venue used by the Phoenix Festival Theater Company, a student run theater group.

Harford Community College also has the Joppa Hall, which houses the Blackbox Theatre, an additional theater venue used by the Harford Dance Theater Company and the HCC Actors Guild. The Joppa Hall also houses the Joppa Recital Halls, a venue for musical performances.

Also at HCC is the Hays-Heighe House, a museum dedicated to the history of Harford County.

The Historical Society of Harford County, one of the oldest county historical societies in Maryland, was established in 1885 to preserve, promote, and interpret the history of the county and its people.  Today, it is headquartered on Main Street in downtown Bel Air in the historic 1936 Old Bel Air Post Office Building, where it maintains an archive, exhibit space, and research library.

Sports
No major league sports teams are based in Harford County. The list of sports teams and organizations are shown below:

Harford County is the hometown of many sports icons, including Kimmie Meissner, a 2006 Olympic figure skating competitor, Cal Ripken, a former Baltimore Orioles Hall of Famer and former Minnesota Vikings linebacker EJ Henderson.

Infrastructure
The Conowingo Dam is on the eastern border of Harford County.

Transportation

Major highways

Mass transportation
Buses are run by the county-owned Harford Transit. The state-operated MARC Penn Line serves Edgewood and Aberdeen.

Airport
The Harford County Airport is a small airport in Churchville. Its available for recreational pilots & flight training, as well as sight seeing, balloon rides, hang gliding and sky diving.

Health
Health services are provided by Upper Chesapeake Health System. Harford Memorial Hospital located in Havre De Grace and Upper Chesapeake Medical Center located in Bel Air form the two hospital system. UCHS is a member of the University of Maryland Medical System.

Education

Primary and secondary education

Harford County Public Schools

The Harford County Public Schools system is the public school system serving the residents of Harford County. It includes thirty-two elementary schools, nine middle schools, ten high schools and one charter school.

Private schools
 Harford Christian School, a Christian school for pre-kindergarten through 12th grade.
 The John Carroll School, a Catholic school for 9th through 12th grade.
 Trinity Lutheran School, a Lutheran school for pre-kindergarten through 8th grade.
 Harford Day School, a private school for Kindergarten through 8th grades.
 Harford Friends School, a Quaker school for Kindergarten through 8th grades.
 Saint Margaret School, a Catholic school for pre-kindergarten through 8th grade.
 Grace Classical Academy, formerly Oak Grove Classical Christian School, is a Classical Christian school for pre-kindergarten through 12th grade. 
 The Highlands School is a private, independent, AIMS accredited, K-12 program designed for students with dyslexia, ADHD, and language-based learning differences.

Colleges
Harford Community College, located in Churchville, offers 2-year associate degrees and vocational programs. Recently, Harford County Community College has entered into several partnerships with local four-year colleges for enhanced offerings, for credit at those institutions, to be taught on campus and at the surrounding buildings. Towson University Harford Campus, located across from Harford Community College, offers a select amount of four-year degrees that students can obtain after completing the required credits at Harford Community College.

Media
The newspaper of record is The Aegis. Several radio stations are located in Harford County. WAMD at 970 AM licensed to Aberdeen follows the format of Top40. WHFC at 91.1 FM licensed to Bel-Air follows the format of Variety. WHGM at 1330 AM/104.7 FM licensed toHavre De Grace follows the format of Adult hits. WXCY-FM at 103.7 FM licensed to Havre De Grace follows the format of Country. The Harford Cable Network, or HCN, provides local TV. It shows local government events, high school and Fighting Owl sporting events and religious programming, among others.

References

 
Maryland counties
1773 establishments in Maryland
Populated places established in 1773
Maryland counties on the Chesapeake Bay